Xenerpestes is the genus of greytails, birds in the family Furnariidae. It contains the following species:

 Equatorial greytail, Xenerpestes singularis
 Double-banded greytail, Xenerpestes minlosi

References

 
Bird genera
Taxonomy articles created by Polbot